Dreher is a second-class township in Wayne County, Pennsylvania, United States. The township's population was 1,412 at the time of the 2010 United States Census.

History
The Bridge in Dreher Township and Patriotic Order Sons of America Washington Camp 422 are listed on the National Register of Historic Places.

Geography

Communities
The following villages are located in Dreher Township:
Angels
East Sterling
Haags Mill
Newfoundland
South Sterling

In addition, the township is also home to one private community, Breezewood Acres.

Demographics

As of the census of 2010, there were 1,412 people, 542 households, and 358 families residing in the township.  The population density was 95.1 people per square mile (36.7/km2).  There were 703 housing units at an average density of 47.3/sq mi.  The racial makeup of the township was 95.6% White, 2.1% African American, 0.3% Native American, 0.4% Asian, 0.1% Pacific Islander, 0.5% from other races, and 1% from two or more races. Hispanic or Latino of any race were 4.9% of the population.

There were 542 households, out of which 27.7% had children under the age of 18 living with them, 53.3% were married couples living together, 7.2% had a female householder with no husband present, and 33.9% were non-families. 28.4% of all households were made up of individuals, and 13.3% had someone living alone who was 65 years of age or older.  The average household size was 2.44 and the average family size was 2.98.

In the township the population was spread out, with 20% under the age of 18, 63.1% from 18 to 64, and 16.9% who were 65 years of age or older.  The median age was 45.6 years.

The median income for a household in the township was $32,639, and the median income for a family was $42,708. Males had a median income of $31,989 versus $22,109 for females. The per capita income for the township was $15,945.  About 9.7% of families and 12.2% of the population were below the poverty line, including 16.3% of those under age 18 and 9.5% of those age 65 or over.

References

External links
Greene Dreher Volunteer Fire Association

Townships in Wayne County, Pennsylvania
Townships in Pennsylvania